Miscera pammelas is a moth in the family Brachodidae. It was described by Turner in 1913. It is found in Australia.

References

Natural History Museum Lepidoptera generic names catalog

Brachodidae
Moths described in 1913